Steve Peters may refer to:

Steve Peters (Ontario politician) (born 1963), politician in Ontario, Canada
Steve Peters (Manitoba politician) (1912–1976), politician in Manitoba, Canada
Steve Peters (game designer) (born 1961)
Steve Peters (baseball) (born 1962), Major League Baseball pitcher
Steve Peters (ice hockey) (born 1960), Canadian ice hockey forward
Steve Peters (psychiatrist), English sports psychiatrist

See also
Stephen Peters (born 1978), cricketer
Stephen Peters, screenwriter of Wild Things